Zabrachia tenella, the pine black, is a European species of soldier fly.

References

Stratiomyidae
Diptera of Europe
Insects described in 1866
Taxa named by Johann Friedrich Jaennicke